St. Gabriel's Abbey or Monastery is a former Benedictine nunnery of the Beuron Congregation in Smíchov, Prague, Czech Republic. It was built in the years 1888–1891, in the distinctive Beuronese style, by the congregation's architects Hildebrand de Hemptinne and Ghislain de Béthune. Initially a priory, it was raised to the status of an abbey in 1893. The nuns were forced to move to Austria in 1919. 

From then until 2019 the building belonged to the state and was used by state postal organizations, including the postal museum. Since 2019 it has been privately owned by a property development company.

The church now known as the Church of the Annunciation, popularly called St. Gabriel's, was formerly the conventual church. Since 22 December 1964, both the monastery and the church have been registered as cultural monuments.

The community of nuns dispossessed in 1919 moved to Schloss Bertholdstein in Pertlstein in Styria, Austria, until in 2007 they left the Beuronese Congregation to join the Federation of the Sisters of Saint Lioba, and, as St. Gabriel's Priory once again, moved to Sankt Johann bei Herberstein in Feistritztal.

Gallery

References

Further reading
 Helena Čižinská, ed. Karel Holub and Monica Šebová, transl. Magdalena Průdková: Beuronská umělecká škola v opatství sv. Gabriela v Praze / Die Beuroner Kunstschule in der Abtei Sankt Gabriel in Prag : Ars Bohemica, Prague 1999

Buildings and structures in Prague
Benedictine nunneries